Mimi Kyprianou (1932 – November 22, 2021) was a Greek-born Cypriot public figure and inaugural First Lady of Cyprus from 1977 to 1988 during the presidency of her husband, Spyros Kyprianou. She was Cyprus' first official first lady, as the country's first president, Archbishop Makarios III, was unmarried.

Biography

Kyprianou was born Mimi Pagathrokliton in the city of Veria, Second Hellenic Republic. She moved to London to study English literature. During her time as a student in London, Pagathrokliton met her future husband, Spyros Kyprianou, who was a law student. Pagathrokliton and Kyprianou began collaborating on charitable activities for the National Union of Cypriot Students in England (E.F.E.K.A.), including plays and theater productions to raise money for a night school for Cypriot children in London. The couple married in Athens in 1956 and had two sons, Achilleas and Markos.

Mimi Kyprianou died in Nicosia, where she had been hospitalized at Nicosia New General Hospital, on November 22, 2021, at the age of 89. She was buried in Agios Nikolaos Cemetery in Limassol.

References

1932 births
2021 deaths
First ladies of Cyprus
Greek emigrants to Cyprus
People from Veria
People from Limassol